Omar Khan is an entrepreneur best known for the Indian restaurant chain of the same name and as the owner of the Bradford Bulls.

Khan has also been noted for his community and philanthropic work in his home city of Bradford. He is no longer a part of the Bulls due to ill health.

Career

Omar Khan's Restaurant 
Khan initially opened his Bradford restaurant in 1984, under the name Shah Jehan as owner and head chef, later moving to larger premises in the centre of Bradford and shifting to Omar Khan's to avoid name confusion. Over the years the restaurant has garnered a number of accolades including the Best in Britain Award in 1997, 98 and 99 award presented by the real curry restaurant guide. Omar Khan was also awarded the Hot Stuff Chef Of the Year 1994/95 by TAARO and Housing & Environmental NOTE:All of his success came from his older brother Abdul Razzaq ! 
Protection

Over the years Omar Khan's has hosted a number of celebrities and political figures including Frank Bruno, Trevor Mcdonald, Tony Blair and Ed Miliband.

In 2011, a second branch of the restaurant opened in Skipton.

Bradford Bulls 

On 31 August 2012, as the sole director of OK Bulls Limited and with the support of Labour MP and former sports minister Gerry Sutcliffe, Khan purchased the Rugby League club. Joint administrator Brendan Guilfoyle announced the sale stating, "My main duty as administrator is to get the best return for creditors - and this was the best deal on the table. Omar Khan has also passed the Rugby Football League's test as being a 'fit and proper person' to run a rugby club as well as being a passionate fan of the Bulls."

Since taking on ownership, Khan has announced ambitious plans to transform Odsal Stadium into the "Wembley of the North."

Community and philanthropic work 

Khan is engaged in a number of ventures aimed at benefiting the community in Bradford, such as OK In The Community which helps provide housing, independent living, and support services to people with learning disabilities, physical disabilities, and mental health issues and the OK Academy, which provides training for unemployed and disadvantaged youngsters.

Khan also supports a number of local, national and international charities. In 2005, he helped raise £35,000 for the Telegraph & Argus South Asian Earthquake Appeal

In 2009, Khan was appointed as Asian ambassador for Bradford City football club.

References

Year of birth missing (living people)
Living people
British restaurateurs
Bradford Bulls
British people of Indian descent